Hermann Neiße (5 December 1889 – 20 October 1932) was a German international footballer.

References

1889 births
1932 deaths
Association football defenders
German footballers
Germany international footballers